Rap Sheet is an album by rapper DMX released in 2002.

Track listing
 "Born Loser (Original)"
 "No Problems" (featuring Mysonne, Billy Ray)
 "Three Stories" (featuring Duo)
 "Make A Move (Original)"
 "Get It Right" (featuring Drag-On)
 "Shut 'em Down" (featuring Onyx)
 "More Money, More Cash, More Hoes"  (featuring Jay-Z, Memphis Bleek, Beanie Sigel)
 "Come Back In One Piece" (featuring Aaliyah)
 "Grand Finale (Remix)" (featuring Method Man, Vita, Nas, Ja Rule)
 "Tales From The Darkside"
 "Can't Touch Me Kid"
 "Yeah Yeah" (featuring Drag-On)
 "Make A Move (Remix)"
 "Scenario 2000" (featuring Eve, The LOX, Drag-On)
 "Whatcha Gonna Do?" (featuring Jayo Felony, Method Man)
 "We Be Clubbin' (Remix)" (featuring Ice Cube)
 "Born Loser (Remix)"

References

External links
 Cover

DMX (rapper) albums
2002 albums
Horrorcore albums
Ruff Ryders Entertainment albums